Wudang t'ai chi ch'uan (武當太極拳) is the name of a system of t'ai chi ch'uan (taijiquan) that was developed by a Hong Kong based t'ai chi ch'uan master known as Cheng Tin hung. While Cheng Tinhung never claimed to be teaching any particular school of t'ai chi ch'uan, his uncle was a disciple of the Wu school of t'ai chi ch'uan, which may or may not have had some influence on his own approach to the art.

The Wudang t'ai chi ch'uan system is now being taught in Europe by two of Cheng Tinhung's disciples, Dan Docherty and Ian Cameron, both based in the United Kingdom. The system also continues to be taught in Hong Kong, and the current head of that school is Cheng Tinhung's son Cheng Kam Yan (鄭鑑恩), whose school is called the Hong Kong Tai Chi Association (香港太極總會) and 太極傳承 Tai Chi Heritage (http://www.hktaichi.com/).

Zhang Sanfeng, a highly mythologised figure said to be the founder of t'ai chi ch'uan, lived in the Wudang Mountains and the name "Wudang" used for this T'ai chi ch'uan system was used in order to acknowledge Zhang Sanfeng's status as the founder of t'ai chi ch'uan. There are other schools of T'ai chi ch'uan that also use this name.

The Wudang t'ai chi ch'uan system is also known as “Practical T'ai chi ch'uan”. This name comes from that given to Cheng Tinhung's style by various Chinese martial arts journalists in Hong Kong during Cheng Tinhung's heyday, and from the school's assertion that its t'ai chi is eminently useful as a form of self-defense.  

The Wudang t'ai chi ch'uan system teachers publish that they have links to famous T'ai chi ch'uan masters (see lineage diagram), including Yang Banhou, Wu Quanyou, Wu Jianquan, Cheng Wingkwong (Zheng Rongguang, 鄭榮光), Chen Gengyun (陳耕雲) and Wang Lanting (王蘭亭).

Qi Minxuan
It is thought that Qi Minxuan (齊敏軒) came from Wen County, Hebei Dao in Henan Province. He was a teacher of t'ai chi ch'uan and neigong"Neigong is a type of martial arts which focus on breathing techniques". After losing his family during the Japanese Occupation and Second World War, Qi Minxuan became an itinerant martial arts instructor teaching T'ai chi ch'uan to those that would give him board and lodgings. His father Qi Gechen (齊閣臣) was a disciple of the famed T'ai chi ch'uan master Wu Quanyou. Qi Minxuan also learnt from a Buddhist monk known as Jing Yi (静一, Tranquil One), who learnt t'ai chi ch'uan from Wang Lanting. Qi Minxuan's Buddhist name was Zhi Meng (智孟, Sagacious Elder) and was an enthusiastic student of Chan Buddhism. The fate of Qi Minxuan is unknown.

Cheng Tinhung
Cheng Tinhung (Zheng Tianxiong, 鄭天熊; 1930–2005). As a young boy he studied Southern Boxing (南拳) from his father Cheng Minchueng (鄭綿彰), which was a family style, learnt from his father Cheng Lin (鄭麟)  who was a professional martial artist. As Cheng Tinhung grew older his uncle Cheng Wingkwong (鄭榮光) took an interest in teaching him Wu-style t'ai chi ch'uan. Cheng Wingkwong was a formal disciple of Wu Jianquan, who eventually held the rank of Shifu (師父, or Sifu in Cantonese) in the Wu family's Hong Kong school. At that ranking he had their encouragement to take on disciples of his own and open his own school. Cheng Wingkwong knew of an itinerant martial artist known as Qi Minxuan whose father was a disciple of the founder of the Wu-style, Wu Quanyou. Cheng Wingkwong arranged for his nephew to train with Master Qi from the summer of 1946 to the winter of 1948. Qi Minxuan advised his new disciple Cheng Tinhung, that in order to gain a good reputation as a master of T'ai chi ch'uan he must be both sound in mind and body and also be able to defend himself, thus being able to represent the art in its true form. Cheng Tinhung later took the nickname of the "T'ai chi Bodyguard" for his enthusiastic defence of t'ai chi ch'uan as a martial art.  By all accounts, Cheng was a hellraiser—he liked to drink, eat, and fight as well as train and teach.  His predilections may have contributed to the ill health that plagued him in his later years.

Dan Docherty
Dan Docherty was born in Glasgow, Scotland, in 1954. He graduated with an LLB in 1974 and soon after moved to Hong Kong where he served as an inspector in the Royal Hong Kong Police Force until 1984 .

Soon after he arrived in Hong Kong in 1975 he started training t'ai chi ch'uan under Cheng Tinhung and within a few years was elected to represent Hong Kong in Full-contact Fighting competitions. In 1980 he won the Open Weight Division at the 5th South East Asian Chinese Pugilistic Championships in Malaysia .

In 1985 he was awarded a Postgraduate Diploma in Chinese from Ealing College, London.

He was based in London and travelled extensively teaching and writing about t'ai chi ch'uan. Mr. Docherty was known for his strong views on the history of t'ai chi ch'uan and was seen as a polarizing figure within the world of t'ai chi. In articles and interviews he spoke of confrontations with other t'ai chi teachers, including an infamous meeting with one Shen Hong-xun, a master who claimed to have and to teach "empty force", or the ability to move a person without physical contact. The meeting ended up with Mr. Docherty pouring water over the head of Shen Hong-Xun, not to prove that empty force does not exist but to suggest that Master Shen was unable to summon and use it at that time.

Later in life he suffered from Parkinsons disease. He died on December 9th, 2021.

Ian Cameron
Ian Cameron was born in Edinburgh, Scotland, in 1944.

He first came under the tutelage of Cheng Tinhung in 1971 whilst serving in the armed forces in Hong Kong. On his return to Edinburgh he set up his class which was to evolve into the Five Winds School Of T'ai chi ch'uan.

Ian Cameron teaches in Edinburgh. He also supervises other classes in Scotland and England.

Ian Cameron was born in Edinburgh (Scotland, UK) in 1944. He trained in Tai Chi Chuan with Chen Tin Hung in Hong Kong from 1971 to 1974, and has taught classes now continuously in the UK for over forty years. A student of Judo and Karate from a young age, he was also a keen boxer as a teenager.
It was during his time in the Army while serving in Hong Kong he sought out a teacher in martial Tai Chi Chuan, and became a diligent student of Chen Tin Hung. On leaving the armed forces in 1976/77 he began classes in Edinburgh, effectively introducing the style to the UK. He subsequently returned to Hong Kong in 1980 for a month,  with the purpose of intensively training with Cheng. Cheng Tin Hung was then Mr Cameron's guest in Scotland the following year, and again in 1985 and 86, teaching seminars throughout the UK.
Ian Cameron appeared in Hong Kong newspaper articles with Cheng during the early 70s, and was described in the acknowledgements of Cheng's best known book in the UK (Wutan Tai Chi Chuan) as the ‘elder brother in TCC ‘ of Dan Docherty, current president of the Tai Chi Union for Great Britain. Mr Cameron was a founder member of the Tai Chi Union for Great Britain, and sits as Technical Director of that body. He remains a leading practitioner and teacher of Tai Chi Chuan in the UK and continues to fervently defend the traditional approach to Cheng's system of training.

Wudang t'ai chi ch'uan Lineage

References

Docherty, D. Complete Tai Chi Chuan, The Crowood Press, 1997. 
Cheng, Tinhung & Docherty, D. Wutan Tai Chi Chuan, Published Hong Kong, 1983.
Cheng, Tinhung. Tai Chi Transcendent Art, The Hong Kong Tai Chi Association Press Hong Kong, 1976. (only available in Chinese)
"The Practice of Wudang Tai Chi Chuan " by Ian Cameron, published by Bell & Bain 1997
'The Practice of Wudang Tai Chi Chuan -Tai Chi Weapons Forms" published Reid Williamson, 2000

External links
 Wudang Mountain International Kung Fu Academy
 The Hong Kong Tai Chi Association
 Practical Tai Chi Chuan International's official website
 Wudang Global Federation

Tai chi styles
Neijia